[[]]

Punian or Poonian is a village in Shahkot in Jalandhar district of Punjab State, India. The village is administrated by a congress party sarpanch who is an elected representative of village as per Panchayati raj (India).

Demography 
As of 2011, The village has a total population of 2286 of which include 1164 are males while 1122 are females according to the report published by Census India in 2011. Literacy rate of the village is 70.16%, lower than state average of 75.84%. The population of children under the age of 6 years is 207 out of total population of 2286.

The Village does have both Schedule Tribe and Schedule Caste population of 591 and 207 respectively which turns into total 34.90% of Total Village Population.

As per census 2011, 753 people were engaged in work activities out of the total population of the village which includes 645 males and 108 females. According to census survey report 2011, 711 workers out of total 753 describe their work as main work and rest of workers are involved in marginal activity providing livelihood for 6 months

Education 
Punian has one Government Senior Secondary School and one Government Primary School . The Village Does not have any College in the village, the nearest degree college to the Village is Dav College, Nakodar which is 26 km from the Village and for the Higher Education and Masters Students has to travel to Jalandhar City to study.

Transport 
Sindhar station is the nearest train station.

The Village is well connected by the bus service of both Punjab Roadways and as well as 1 Private Bus company which connects the village with nearest towns of Shahkot, Lohian Khas and Sultanpur Lodhi

References 

Villages in Jalandhar district